The 130T was a steam locomotive type originally operated by Ferrocarriles Vascongados in the Basque Country, Spain. One of the locomotives, named Aurrera, has been preserved at the Basque Railway Museum and is used regularly to haul heritage trains.

History
The early light locomotives bought by the railway companies that would merge to form Ferrocarriles Vascongados were underpowered. The Elgoibar-San Sebastián Railway received six heavier locomotives from Nasmyth & Wilson in 1892, five of which were immediately transferred to the Biscay Central Railway, which needed a substitute for its light Hanomag locomotives. Two more locomotives of the same type were acquired by Biscay Central in 1894, and another one by each of the two companies in 1898.

On 2 April 1904, the four locomotives operated by the Elgoibar-San Sebastián Railway were transferred to the Durango-Zumárraga Railway, and renamed according to the scheme used by Biscay Central. All the locomotives were incorporated into the Ferrocarriles Vascongados fleet in 1906. However, after the introduction of the Euzkadi class locomotives in 1914, the 130T-s were gradually retired and sold to other operators. They were in service with Ferrocarriles Vascongados and other companies until 1964.

List of locomotives
The individual details of the locomotives are as follows.

See also
 Ferrocarriles Vascongados § Rolling stock

References

External links
 

Steam locomotives of Spain
Ferrocarriles Vascongados rolling stock
Railway locomotives introduced in 1892
Nasmyth, Wilson and Company locomotives
2-6-0T locomotives
Metre gauge steam locomotives